The Sail and Anchor Hotel is located on the corner of South Terrace and Henderson Street in Fremantle, Western Australia, opposite the Fremantle Markets.

The Freemasons' Hotel, was constructed in 1901–1903. It replaced the hotel that was originally constructed on the site in 1854 for Nicholas Paterson and Anthony Cornish. In 1901, James Gallop purchased the Freemasons' Hotel property and commissioned architect Frederick William Burwell to design a new hotel for the site. Burwell also designed the Central Chambers, Victoria Pavilion, Fowler's Warehouse, Owston's Buildings and Marmion House. The construction was undertaken by William Reynolds and was carried out in stages so that the hotel could continue to trade. In the 1920s, a first floor wing was added to the western side of the hotel. In 1955, the veranda and balcony was removed and replaced with a suspended awning.

In 1923 the Swan Brewery purchased the hotel from William Padbury, retaining ownership of it until 1977.  In April 1984, the Freemasons' Hotel was sold to Brewtech Ltd who undertook a major restoration and upgrading of the hotel, converting it into Australia's first boutique pub brewery, and renaming it the Sail and Anchor in 1986. The renovations included the restoration of the veranda and balcony.

In 1990 Elders IXL purchased the Matilda Bay Brewing Company (formerly Brewtech Ltd), in a deal that valued Matilda Bay at more than A$50 million, selling the hotel to the Australian Leisure and Hospitality Group (ALH), a subsidiary of Woolworths Limited, who subsequently closed the micro-brewery operations at the hotel for a short time after 2010, however the micro-brewing has since resumed.

References

External links

 

Hotels established in 1903
Hotel buildings completed in 1903
Hotels in Fremantle
1903 establishments in Australia
State Register of Heritage Places in the City of Fremantle
Western Australian places listed on the defunct Register of the National Estate
South Terrace, Fremantle